Firuzabad (also Romanized as Fīrūzābād) is a village in Fuladlui Jonubi Rural District, Hir District, Ardabil County, Ardabil Province, Iran. At the 2006 census, its population was 80, in 18 families.

References 

Towns and villages in Ardabil County